Tibet under Mongol rule refers to the Mongol Empire and Yuan dynasty's rule over Tibet from 1244 to 1354. During the Yuan dynasty rule of Tibet, the region was structurally, militarily and administratively controlled by the Mongol-led Yuan dynasty of China. In the history of Tibet, Mongol rule was established after Sakya Pandita got power in Tibet from the Mongols in 1244, following the 1240 Mongol conquest of Tibet led by the Mongol general with the title doord darkhan. It is also called the Sakya dynasty after the favored Sakya school of Tibetan Buddhism.

The region retained a degree of political autonomy under the Sakya lama, who was the de jure head of Tibet and a spiritual leader of the Mongol Empire. However, administrative and military rule of Tibet remained under the auspices of the Yuan government agency known as the Bureau of Buddhist and Tibetan Affairs or Xuanzheng Yuan, a top-level administrative department separate from other Yuan provinces, but still under the administration of the Yuan dynasty. Tibet retained nominal power over religious and political affairs, while the Yuan dynasty managed a structural and administrative rule over the region, reinforced by the rare military intervention. This existed as a "diarchic structure" under the Yuan emperor, with power primarily in favor of the Mongols. One of the department's purposes was to select a dpon-chen, usually appointed by the lama and confirmed by the Yuan emperor in Beijing.

History

Conquest of Tibet 

Tibet has been invaded by the Mongol Empire in 1240 and 1244. The first invasion was by Prince Köden or Godan, grandson of Genghis Khan and son of Ögedei Khan. The second invasion by Möngke Khan resulted in the entire region falling under Mongol rule. Kublai Khan incorporated the region into his later Yuan dynasty, but left the legal system intact. Drogön Chögyal Phagpa, the Sakya lama, became a religious teacher to Kublai, who made him the nominal head of the region.

Mongol rule (1244-1260) 
Although the Yuan maintained administrative rule of Tibet, scholarly opinion on the exact nature of this rule is disputed: according to different sources, it is considered a direct subject, an indirect part of the Yuan dynasty or an "autonomous" region outside direct Yuan rule, but subject to the greater Mongol Empire. While no modern equivalents remain, the relationship is analogous to that of the British Empire and the British Raj in India.

The rule was described in the Mongolian chronicle "Ten Laudable Laws", which describes "two orders", one order based on the religious and one order based on the secular. Religious is based on the Sutras and Dharani, secular on peace and tranquillity. The Sakya Lama is responsible for the religious order, the Yuan emperor for the secular. The religion and the state became dependent on each other, each with its own functions, but the will of the Emperor, through the dpon chen, held the de facto upper hand.

Through their influence with the Yuan rulers, Tibetan lamas gained considerable influence in various Mongol clans. Besides Kublai, there were, for example, clear lines of influence between scattered areas of Tibet and the Mongol Ilkhanate based in Persia. Kublai's success in succeeding Möngke as Great Khan meant that after 1260, Phagpa and the House of Sakya would only wield greater influence. Phagpa became head of all Buddhist monks in the Yuan empire. Tibet would also enjoy a rather high degree of autonomy compared to other parts of the Yuan empire, although further expeditions took place in 1267, 1277, 1281 and 1290/91.

Yuan rule through House of Sakya

Kublai Khan 

Drogön Chögyal Phagpa was the spiritual advisor and guru to Kublai Khan. In 1260, Kublai appointed Chögyal Phagpa as "Guoshi", or State Preceptor, in 1260, the year when he became Khagan. Phagpa was the first "to initiate the political theology of the relationship between state and religion in the Tibeto-Mongolian Buddhist world". With the support of Kublai Khan, Chögyal Phagpa established himself and his sect as the preeminent spiritual leader in Tibet, and in the wider Mongol Empire. In 1265 Drogön Chögyal Phagpa returned to Tibet and for the first time made an attempt to impose Sakya hegemony with the appointment of Shakya Bzang-po, a long time servant and ally of the Sakyas, as the Mongol approved dpon-chen, or great administrator, over Tibet in 1267. A census was conducted in 1268 and Tibet was divided into thirteen myriarchies. While maintaining administrative control through the dpon-chen, Kublai's relationship with the Sakya Lama became known in the Tibetan tradition as the patron and priest relationship. Subsequently, each Yuan emperor had a Lama as a spiritual guide.

According to Rossabi, Khublai established a system in which a Sakya lama would be "Imperial Preceptor" or Dishi (originally "State Preceptor" or Guoshi), who would reside in China and supervise all the Buddhists of the empire, and a Tibetan called dpon-chen (Ponchen) or "Civil Administrator" would live in Tibet to administer it. Nevertheless, this system also led to conflicts between the Sakya leaders and the dpon-chens.

Kublai Khan commissioned Chögyal Phagpa to design a new writing system to unify the writing of the multilingual Mongol Empire. Chögyal Phagpa in turn modified the traditional Tibetan script and gave birth to a new set of characters called Phagspa script which was completed in 1268. Kublai Khan decided to use the Phagspa script as the official writing system of the empire, including when he became Emperor of China in 1271, instead of the Chinese ideogrammes and the Uyghur script. However, he encountered major resistances and difficulties when trying to promote this script and never achieved his original goal. As a result, only a small number of texts were written in this script, and the majority were still written in Chinese ideogrammes or the Uyghur alphabet. The script fell into disuse after the collapse of the Yuan dynasty in 1368. The script was, though never widely, used for about a century and is thought to have influenced the development of modern Korean script.

Revolt 
The Sakya hegemony over Tibet continued into the middle of the fourteenth century, although it was challenged by a revolt of the Drikung Kagyu sect with the assistance of Duwa of the Chagatai Khanate in 1285. The revolt was suppressed in 1290 when the Sakyas and the Yuan army under , Kublai's grandson, burned Drigung Monastery and killed 10,000 people.

Decline of the Yuan 
Between 1346 and 1354, the Yuan dynasty was weakening from uprisings in the main Chinese provinces. As Yuan declined, in Tibet, Tai Situ Changchub Gyaltsen toppled the Sakya and founded the Phagmodrupa dynasty, the rulers of which belonged to the Kagyu sect. The succession of Sakya lamas in Tibet came to an end in 1358, when central Tibet in its entirety came under control of the Kagyu sect, and Tibet's independence was restored, to last nearly 400 years. "By the 1370s the lines between the schools of Buddhism were clear." Nevertheless, the Phagmodrupa founder avoided directly resisting the Yuan court until its fall in 1368, when his successor Jamyang Shakya Gyaltsen decided to open relations with the Ming dynasty, founded by ethnic Han.

See also 

 Patron and priest relationship
 Bureau of Buddhist and Tibetan Affairs
 Ming–Tibet relations
 Tibet under Qing rule
 Lifan Yuan
 Yuan dynasty in Inner Asia
 Mongolia under Yuan rule
 Manchuria under Yuan rule
 Korea under Yuan rule

Notes

References

Citations

Sources 

 
 
 
 
 
 
 
 
 

Yuan dynasty
History of Tibet
13th century in Tibet
14th century in Tibet
China–Tibet relations